Lemuel Boozer House, also known as the Boozer-Harmon House, is a historic home located in the town of Lexington in Lexington County, South Carolina. The home belonged to lawyer, politician, and judge Lemuel Boozer (1809-1870). It was built about 1828–1830 and is a one-story clapboard dwelling on a raised basement. It has a low-pitch gable roof and a tall basement of brick piers. A rear ell and wing were added in the 1840s. It was listed on the National Register of Historic Places in 1977. It is one of the oldest structures in the town of Lexington.

Lemuel Boozer  
Lemuel Boozer was a lawyer who served as state representative, state senator, and lieutenant governor of South Carolina of South Carolina, and as a state circuit judge. Although Boozer was a slave owner, he did not support the Confederacy and helped Union soldiers escape from POW Camps. Boozer also started a school on the rear of this property for freed slaves after the end of the Civil War.

See also 

 Lieutenant Governor of South Carolina
 List of lieutenant governors of South Carolina
 South Carolina General Assembly

References

Houses on the National Register of Historic Places in South Carolina
Houses completed in 1830
Houses in Lexington County, South Carolina
National Register of Historic Places in Lexington County, South Carolina
1830 establishments in South Carolina